The 22933/22934 Bandra Terminus - Jaipur Weekly Superfast Express is a Superfast train belonging to Western Railway zone that runs between Bandra Terminus and Jaipur in India. It is currently being operated with 22933/22934 train numbers on a weekly basis.

Service

The 22933/Bandra Terminus - Jaipur Weekly Superfast Express has an average speed of 62 km/hr and covers 1149 km in 18h 30m.

The 22934/Jaipur - Bandra Terminus Weekly Superfast Express has an average speed of 61 km/hr and covers 1149 km in 18h 45m.

Route and halts 

The important halts of the train are:

Schedule

Coach composite

The train has modern LHB rakes with max speed of 110 kmph. The train consists of 20 coaches :

 2 AC II Tier
 4 AC III Tier
 8 Sleeper Coaches
 4 General
 2 Seating cum Luggage Rake

Traction

Both trains are hauled by an Electric Loco Shed, Vadodara based WAP-5 or WAP-4E electric locomotive from Bandra to Sawai Madhopur. From Sawai Madhopur trains are hauled by a Diesel Loco Shed, Bhagat Ki Kothi based WDP-4 diesel locomotives uptil Jaipur and vice versa.

Direction Reversal

Rake sharing 

The train shares its rake with 22931/22932 Bandra Terminus - Jaisalmer Superfast Express.

Notes

References 

Transport in Mumbai
Transport in Jaipur
Express trains in India
Rail transport in Maharashtra
Rail transport in Gujarat
Rail transport in Rajasthan
Railway services introduced in 2014